The 2022 College Football All-America Team includes those players of American college football who have been honored by various selector organizations as the best players at their respective positions.  The selector organizations award the "All-America" honor annually following the conclusion of the fall college football season.  The original All-America team was the 1889 College Football All-America Team selected by Caspar Whitney and Walter Camp. The National Collegiate Athletic Bureau, which is the National Collegiate Athletic Association's (NCAA) service bureau, compiled, in the 1950, the first list of All-Americans including first-team selections on teams created for a national audience that received national circulation with the intent of recognizing selections made from viewpoints that were nationwide.  Since 1957, College Sports Information Directors of America (CoSIDA) has bestowed Academic All-American recognition on male and female athletes in Divisions I, II, and III of the NCAA as well as National Association of Intercollegiate Athletics athletes, including all NCAA championship sports.

The 2022 College Football All-America Team is composed of the following College Football All-American first teams chosen by the following selector organizations: Associated Press (AP), Football Writers Association of America (FWAA), American Football Coaches Association (AFCA), Walter Camp Foundation (WCFF), Sporting News (TSN, from its historic name of The Sporting News), Sports Illustrated (SI), The Athletic (Athletic), USA Today (USAT), ESPN, CBS Sports (CBS), College Football News (CFN), Scout.com, Athlon Sports, Phil Steele, and Fox Sports (FOX).

Currently, the NCAA compiles consensus all-America teams in the sports of Division I FBS football and Division I men's basketball using a point system computed from All-America teams named by coaches associations or media sources.  Players are chosen against other players playing at their position only.  To be selected a consensus All-American, players must be chosen to the first team on at least half of the five official selectors as recognized by the NCAA.  Second- and third-team honors are used to break ties.  Players named first-team by all five selectors are deemed unanimous All-Americans. Currently, the NCAA recognizes All-Americans selected by the AP, AFCA, FWAA, TSN, and the WCFF to determine consensus and unanimous All-Americans.

The following players were recognized as consensus All-Americans for 2022. Fourteen of them were recognized unanimously. Unanimous selections are followed by an asterisk (*).

Offense

Quarterback
 Caleb Williams, USC (AP, AFCA, FWAA, TSN, WCFF, ESPN, CBS, FOX, The Athletic, USAT)

Running back
Blake Corum, Michigan (AP, AFCA, FWAA, TSN, WCFF, ESPN, CBS, FOX, The Athletic, USAT)
Bijan Robinson, Texas (AP, AFCA, FWAA, TSN, WCFF, ESPN, CBS, FOX, The Athletic, USAT)

Wide receiver
Marvin Harrison Jr., Ohio State (AP, AFCA, FWAA, TSN, WCFF, ESPN, CBS, FOX, The Athletic, USAT)
Jalin Hyatt, Tennessee (AP, AFCA,  FWAA, TSN, WCFF, ESPN, CBS, FOX, The Athletic, USAT)
Xavier Hutchinson, Iowa State (AP)
Charlie Jones, Purdue (FOX)

Tight end
Brock Bowers, Georgia (AFCA, FWAA, ESPN, USAT)
Michael Mayer, Notre Dame (AP, TSN, WCFF, CBS, FOX, The Athletic)

Offensive line
Joe Alt, Notre Dame (AP, ESPN, CBS)
Steve Avila, TCU (AFCA, FWAA, WCFF, FOX)
Cooper Beebe, Kansas State (TSN, ESPN, FOX, The Athletic)
Paris Johnson Jr., Ohio State (AFCA, FWAA, WCFF, The Athletic)
Dawand Jones, Ohio State (CBS)
Olusegun Oluwatimi, Michigan (AFCA, FWAA, TSN, WCFF, ESPN, FOX, The Athletic, USAT)
Alex Palczewski, Illinois (TSN)
John Michael Schmitz, Minnesota (AP, FWAA, CBS, USAT)
Peter Skoronski, Northwestern (AP, AFCA, FWAA, TSN, WCFF, ESPN, CBS, FOX, The Athletic, USAT)
O'Cyrus Torrence, Florida (AP, AFCA, TSN, WCFF, ESPN, CBS, The Athletic, USAT)
Andrew Vorhees, USC (AP, FOX, USAT)

Defense

Defensive line
Felix Anudike-Uzomah, Kansas State (USAT)
Jalen Carter, Georgia (AP, AFCA, FWAA, TSN, WCFF, ESPN, CBS, FOX, The Athletic, USAT)
Isaiah Foskey, Notre Dame (AFCA, WCFF)
Calijah Kancey, Pittsburgh (AP, AFCA, FWAA, TSN, WCFF, ESPN, FOX, CBS)
Tuli Tuipulotu, USC (AP, AFCA, FWAA, TSN, WCFF, ESPN, CBS, FOX, The Athletic, USAT)
Jared Verse, Florida State (The Athletic)
Tyree Wilson, Texas Tech (FWAA, The Athletic, USAT)

Linebacker
Will Anderson Jr., Alabama (AP, AFCA, FWAA, TSN, WCFF, ESPN, CBS, FOX, The Athletic, USAT)
Jack Campbell, Iowa (AP, AFCA, FWAA, TSN, WCFF, ESPN, CBS, The Athletic, USAT)
Jamon Dumas-Johnson, Georgia (TSN, ESPN)
Ivan Pace Jr., Cincinnati (AP, AFCA, FWAA, TSN, WCFF, ESPN, CBS, FOX, The Athletic, USAT)
 Drew Sanders, Arkansas (AP)
 Nick Herbig, Wisconsin  (FOX)

Defensive back
Brian Branch, Alabama (ESPN, CBS)
Emmanuel Forbes, Mississippi State (AFCA, FWAA, WCFF, ESPN, FOX, The Athletic)
 Tre'Vius Hodges-Tomlinson, TCU (AP, TSN, ESPN, USAT)
Kamren Kinchens, Miami (FL) (AP, TSN, ESPN, CBS, The Athletic, USAT)
Kaevon Merriweather, Iowa (CBS)
Clark Phillips III, Utah (AP, AFCA, FWAA, TSN, WCFF, CBS, FOX, The Athletic, USAT)
Christopher Smith II, Georgia (AP, AFCA, FWAA, TSN, WCFF, USAT)
Devon Witherspoon, Illinois (AP, AFCA, FWAA, WCFF, CBS, FOX, The Athletic)
 Joey Porter Jr., Penn State  (FOX)

Special teams

Kicker
Christopher Dunn, NC State (AP, AFCA, FWAA, WCFF, ESPN, CBS, FOX, The Athletic, USAT)
Joshua Karty, Stanford (TSN)

Punter
Bryce Baringer, Michigan State (AP, AFCA, WCFF, CBS, FOX)
Adam Korsak, Rutgers (TSN, USAT)
Kai Kroeger, South Carolina (ESPN, The Athletic)
Tory Taylor, Iowa (FWAA)

Long snapper
Michael Vinson, Notre Dame (AFCA)

All-purpose / return specialist
Israel Abanikanda, Pittsburgh (ESPN, CBS)
Zach Charbonnet, UCLA (FWAA)
Anthony Gould, Oregon State (TSN, ESPN, CBS)
Jaylin Lucas, Indiana (WCFF, CBS, FOX, USAT)
Will Shipley, Clemson (USAT)
Deuce Vaughn, Kansas State (AP, AFCA, TSN, FOX, The Athletic)
 Derius Davis, TCU (FOX)

Footnotes

References
American Football Coaches Association All-America Team
Associated Press All-America Team
CBS Sports All-America Team
ESPN All-America Team
 FOX All-America Team
Football Writers Association of America All-America Team
Sporting News All-America Team
The Athletic All-America Team
USA Today All-America Team
Walter Camp Football Foundation All-America Team

All-America Team
College Football All-America Teams